Micrixalus mallani is a species of frogs in the family Micrixalidae.
It is endemic to the Western Ghats, India.

Its natural habitats are subtropical or tropical moist lowland forest and rivers.

This species is named after Mr. Mallan Kani, in appreciation of his tremendous support and companionship to S D Biju in field, since 1998.

References

Micrixalus
Endemic fauna of the Western Ghats
Frogs of India
Amphibians described in 2014
Taxa named by Sathyabhama Das Biju